Qillqatani (Aymara qillqaña to write, -ta a suffix to indicate the participle, -ni a suffix to indicate ownership, "the one with something written",  Hispanicized Qelqatani, Quelcatani) is an archaeological site in Peru. Qillqatani is surrounded by dry puna.

The site was declared a National Cultural Heritage (Patrimonio Cultural) of Peru. Qillqatani is known for its elaborate rock art panels.

Archaeology
Qillqatani is the first archaeological site in the Lake Titicaca basin to be systematically excavated. Archaeologists have identified 36 cultural strata at the site. From 7500 to 4000 BP, Qillqatani was inhabited by hunter-gatherers as a seasonal campsite. These early occupants hunted mostly camelids, and some deer. From 3660 BP onwards, Qillqatani was inhabited by pastoralist camelid-herders who built houses and began to occupy the site long-term. These later occupants also began to trade with people from lower attitudes to obtain Chenopodium.

See also
Jiskairumoko
 Soro Mik'aya Patjxa

References

Bibliography

External links
 Spatial and Temporal Variation in Stone Raw Material Provisioning in the Chivay Obsidian Source Area

Rock art in South America
Archaeological sites in Puno Region
Archaeological sites in Peru
High-altitude archaeology
Petroglyphs in South America